Garacharma Island is an island of the Andaman Islands. It belongs to the South Andaman administrative district, part of the Indian union territory of Andaman and Nicobar Islands.

Geography
The island belongs to the Port Blair Islands and lies in the middle of Flat Bay.

Administration
Politically, Garacharma Island, along neighboring Port Blair Islands, are part of Port Blair Taluk.

References 

Islands of South Andaman district
Uninhabited islands of India
Islands of India
Islands of the Bay of Bengal